Susie Porter (born 1970 or 1971) is an Australian television, film and theatre actress. She made her debut in the 1996 film Idiot Box, before rising to prominence in films including Paradise Road (1997), Welcome to Woop Woop (1997), Two Hands (1999), Better Than Sex (2000), The Monkey's Mask (2000), Mullet (2001), Teesh and Trude (2002), and The Caterpillar Wish (2006). Porter is also highly recognised for her roles in television series, most notably, as Patricia Wright in East West 101, Eve Pritchard in East of Everything, as Kay Parker in Sisters of War, and as Marie Winter in the prison drama, Wentworth.

Early life
Porter was born in Newcastle, New South Wales, to Bill, a doctor, and Jenny, a nurse. She has two older sisters, Cathy and Jackie, and a younger sister, Louise. Porter attended Newcastle Grammar School and earned a bachelor of arts from the University of Newcastle. She graduated from the National Institute of Dramatic Art (NIDA) in 1995.

Acting career

Television
Porter began her acting career in an episode of House Gang, a short lived television program. She then had small roles in other Australian television programs in the late 1990s, including Big Sky, Wildside and Water Rats.

In 2006, Porter had a leading role in RAN, an Australian mini-series, which won her a Best Leading Actress in a Television Drama at the AFI Awards. In late 2007, she appeared in East West 101, a six-part drama series that aired on SBS. In 2008, Porter appeared in East of Everything (a six-part drama series that aired on the ABC) and in the mini-series Make Or Break (an English and Australian production that aired on Foxtel's UKTV).

In 2009, Porter appeared on the second seasons of both East of Everything and East West 101, and first run The Jesters and My Place. In 2010, she appeared on the telemovie Sisters of War as Kay Parker. In 2011, she appeared in the third, and final season, of East West 101. In 2012, she appeared on Channel Ten's mini-series Bikie Wars: Brothers in Arms. She played Pam Knight in Puberty Blues from 2012 to 2014.

In 2017, Porter was cast in the Foxtel drama series Wentworth in the main role Marie Winter; the role was originally portrayed by Maggie Millar in Prisoner. Porter first appeared in Wentworth during the fourth episode of the sixth season, broadcast on 10 July 2018. She reprised her role as Marie Winter in the seventh season in 2019, and again in the eighth and final season which premiered in 2020 and ended in 2021. She made her final appearance in penultimate episode of the final season.

Film
In 1996, Porter made her film debut in Idiot Box. In 1997, she starred as Angie in the Australian comedy Welcome to Woop Woop. In 1999, she had a major role in Two Hands. In 2000, she starred in the film Bootmen and in the crime drama film The Monkey's Mask, which she plays a lesbian private detective who falls in love with a suspect, for which she won the award for 'Best Actress' at the Dallas OUT TAKES festival in 2001. In 2001, she appeared in the Australian movie Mullet and had a small role in Star Wars: Episode II – Attack of the Clones.

In 2005, Porter had a supporting role in the Australian film Little Fish. In 2006, she had a role in the film The Caterpillar Wish which won her Best Supporting Actress in the AFI Awards.

In 2015, Porter starred in "Is this the real world".

Porter appeared in 2022 film 'GOLD' as Stranger/Strangers sister which was filmed in South Australia.

Porter in 2023 appeared in the short film Waves at Bondi's Flickerfest.

Theatre
In 2011, Porter starred as Olive in the play Summer of the Seventeenth Doll at the Belvoir Theatre, Sydney.

Filmography

Awards
 2009 – Best Lead Actress in Television Drama for East West 101 at the AFI Awards
 2007 – Most Outstanding Actress for RAN at the Logies
 2006 – Best Lead Actress in Television Drama for RAN at the AFI Awards
 2006 – Best Supporting Actress for The Caterpillar Wish at the AFI Awards

Also been nominated at the AFI Awards in: 
 2011 – Best Guest or Supporting Actress in a Television Drama
 2003 – Best Actress in a Leading Role for Teesh and Trude
 2000 – Best Actress in a Leading Role for Better Than Sex
 1999 – Best Supporting Actress for Two Hands

References

External links

Susie Porter on Instagram 

1970s births
Actresses from New South Wales
Australian film actresses
Australian television actresses
Living people
Logie Award winners
National Institute of Dramatic Art alumni
People from Newcastle, New South Wales
University of Newcastle (Australia) alumni
Best Supporting Actress AACTA Award winners
20th-century Australian actresses
21st-century Australian actresses